The 1988 FIFA Women's Invitation Tournament, or International Women's Football Tournament, was organised by FIFA in China from 1 to 12 June 1988. The competition was a test to study if a global women's World Cup was feasible following the experience of non-FIFA invitational competitions such as the Mundialito (1981–88) and the Women's World Invitational Tournament (1978–87). The competition was a success and on 30 June FIFA approved the establishment of an official World Cup for 1991, which would also be held in China.

Twelve national teams took part in the competition – four from UEFA, three from AFC, two from CONCACAF and one from CONMEBOL, CAF and OFC. European champion Norway defeated Sweden 1–0 in the final to win the tournament, while Brazil clinched the bronze by beating the hosts in a penalty shootout. Australia, Canada, the Netherlands and the United States also reached the final stages.

Venues
The tournament took place in 4 cities in the province of Guangdong: Guangzhou, Foshan, Jiangmen and Panyu.

Teams
12 national teams participated in the tournament, all invited by FIFA.

Group stage

Group A

The matches of China were held in Guangzhou. The rest of the matches of this group were held in Foshan.

Group B

All matches held in Jiangmen.

Group C

All matches held in Panyu.

Ranking of third-placed teams

Knockout stage

Bracket

Quarter-finals

Semi-finals

Third place play-off

Final

All-Star Team
The all star team was voted by the Chinese press.
 Elisabeth Leidinge
 Liv Strædet
 Marie Karlsson
 Heidi Støre
 Eva Zeikfalvy
 Roseli
 Linda Medalen
 Carin Jennings
 Sun Qingmei
 Cebola
 Ellen Scheel

See also
 1991 FIFA Women's World Cup

References

FIFA Women's World Cup tournaments
FIFA
1988
Women
Fifa
1988 in Chinese women's sport
June 1988 sports events in Asia